Franz Schubert's compositions of 1818 are mostly in the Deutsch catalogue (D) range D 599–632, and include:
 Instrumental works:
 Symphony, D 615 (sketch)
 Piano Sonata in C major, D 613
 Piano Sonata in F minor, D 625
 Vocal music:
 Three Sonnets, D 628–630, with German texts after Petrarch

Table

Legend

List

|-
| 599
| 599
| data-sort-value="075,1827-0" | 75(1827)
| data-sort-value="0903,026" | IX, 3No. 26
| data-sort-value="714,08" | VII/1, 4
| data-sort-value="Polonaises, 4" | Four Polonaises
| data-sort-value="key I" | Various keys
| data-sort-value="1818-07-01" | July 1818
| For piano duet
|-
| 600
| 600
| data-sort-value="XXX,1897" | (1897)
| data-sort-value="2103,027" | XXI, 3No. 27
| data-sort-value="724,00" | VII/2, 4
| Minuet, D 600
| data-sort-value="key C-sharp minor" | C minor
| data-sort-value="1814-01-01" | early 1814?
|-
| 601
| data-sort-value="999.0470" | 470
| data-sort-value="ZZZZ" |

| data-sort-value="ZZZZ" |

| data-sort-value="ZZZZ" |

| data-sort-value="ZZZZ" |

| data-sort-value="ZZZZ" |

| data-sort-value="ZZZZ" |

| See 
|-
| 602
| 602
| data-sort-value="027,1824-0" | 27(1824)
| data-sort-value="0901,001" | IX, 1No. 1
| data-sort-value="714,01" | VII/1, 4
| data-sort-value="Marches heroiques, 3" | Trois Marches héroiques
| data-sort-value="key I" | Various keys
| data-sort-value="1818-01-01" | 1818 or 1824
| For piano duet
|-
| 604
| 604
| data-sort-value="XXX,1888" | (1888)
| data-sort-value="1100,010" | XI No. 10
| data-sort-value="724,00" | VII/2, 4
| Piano piece, D 604, a.k.a. Andante
| data-sort-value="key A major" | A major
| data-sort-value="1816-01-01" | 1816 or 1817
| 2nd movement of ?
|-
| 605
| 605
| data-sort-value="XXX,1897" | (1897)
| data-sort-value="2103,015" | XXI, 3No. 15
| data-sort-value="724,00" | VII/2, 4 Anh.
| Fantasy, D 605
| data-sort-value="key C major" | C major
| data-sort-value="1822-07-01" | 1821–1823
| For piano; Fragment
|-
| data-sort-value="999.06051" |
| data-sort-value="605.1" | 605A
| data-sort-value="XXX,1969" | (1969)
| data-sort-value="ZZZZ" |
| data-sort-value="724,00" | VII/2, 4
| Fantasy, D 605A, a.k.a. Grazer Fantasy
| data-sort-value="key C major" | C major
| data-sort-value="1818-01-01" | 1818?
| For piano
|-
| 606
| 606
| data-sort-value="XXX,1840" | (1840)
| data-sort-value="1100,016" | XI No. 16
| data-sort-value="724,00" | VII/2, 4
| March, D 606
| data-sort-value="key E major" | E major
| data-sort-value="1818-01-01" | 1818?
| For piano
|-
| 607
| 607
| data-sort-value="ZZZZ" |
| data-sort-value="ZZZZ" |
| data-sort-value="108,00" | I, 8
| Evangelium Johannis 6, Vers 55–58
| data-sort-value="text In der Zeit sprach der Herr Jesus" | In der Zeit sprach der Herr Jesus
| data-sort-value="1818-01-01" | 1818
| data-sort-value="Text by John, In der Zeit sprach der Herr Jesus" | Text by John (Luther translation); For voice and figured bass
|-
| 608
| 608
| data-sort-value="138,1834-0" | 138p(1834)
| data-sort-value="0902,014" | IX, 2No. 14
| data-sort-value="711,04" | VII/1, 1 No. 4 & Anh. No. 4
| Rondo, D 608, "Notre amitié est invariable"
| data-sort-value="key D major" | D major
| data-sort-value="1818-01-01" | January1818
| For piano duet; Two versions: 2nd, in AGA, is Op. posth. 138
|-
| data-sort-value="609" | 609665
| 609
| data-sort-value="XXX,1872" | (1872)
| data-sort-value="1700,013" | XVIINo. 13
| data-sort-value="302,10" | III, 2aNo. 10
| data-sort-value="Geselligkeit, Die" | Die Geselligkeit a.k.a. Lebenslust
| data-sort-value="text Wer Lebenslust fuhlet" | Wer Lebenslust fühlet
| data-sort-value="1818-01-01" | January1818
|-
| 610
| 610
| data-sort-value="XXX,1889" | (1889)
| data-sort-value="1200,031" | XIINo. 31
| data-sort-value="726,00" | VII/2, 6
| Trio, D 610
| data-sort-value="key E major" | E major
| data-sort-value="1818-02-01" | February1818
|-
| 611
| 611
| data-sort-value="XXX,1850" | (1850)
| data-sort-value="2005,336" | XX, 5No. 336
| data-sort-value="412,00" | IV, 12
| Auf der Riesenkoppe
| data-sort-value="text Hoch auf dem Gipfel deiner Gebirge" | Hoch auf dem Gipfel deiner Gebirge
| data-sort-value="1818-03-01" | March 1818
| data-sort-value="Text by Korner, Theodor, Hoch auf dem Gipfel deiner Gebirge" | Text by Körner
|-
| 612
| 612
| data-sort-value="XXX,1869" | (1869)
| data-sort-value="1100,011" | XI No. 11
| data-sort-value="724,00" | VII/2, 4
| Adagio, D 612
| data-sort-value="key E major" | E major
| data-sort-value="1818-04-01" | April 1818
| For piano; 2nd movement of ?
|-
| 613
| 613
| data-sort-value="XXX,1897" | (1897)
| data-sort-value="2102,011" | XXI, 2No. 11
| data-sort-value="722,07" | VII/2, 2
| Piano Sonata, D 613
| data-sort-value="key C major" | C major
| data-sort-value="1818-04-01" | April 1818
| Moderato – [?]; Fragments;  and 600/610 may constitute its other movements
|-
| 614
| 614
| data-sort-value="XXX,1832" | (1832)
| data-sort-value="2005,337" | XX, 5No. 337
| data-sort-value="412,00" | IV, 12
| An den Mond in einer Herbstnacht
| data-sort-value="text Freundlich ist dein Antlitz" | Freundlich ist dein Antlitz
| data-sort-value="1818-04-01" | April 1818
| data-sort-value="Text by Schreiber, Aloys, Freundlich ist dein Antlitz"| Text by 
|-
| 615
| 615
| data-sort-value="ZZZZ" |
| data-sort-value="ZZZZ" |
| data-sort-value="506,09" | V, 6 No. 9
| Symphony, D 615
| data-sort-value="key D major" | D major
| data-sort-value="1818-05-01" | May 1818
| Adagio, Allegro moderato – [?]; Sketches
|-
| 616
| 616
| data-sort-value="XXX,1830" | (1830)
| data-sort-value="2005,338" | XX, 5No. 338
| data-sort-value="412,00" | IV, 12
| data-sort-value="Grablied fur die Mutter" | Grablied für die Mutter
| data-sort-value="text Hauche milder, Abendluft" | Hauche milder, Abendluft
| data-sort-value="1818-06-01" | June 1818
| data-sort-value="ZZZZ" |
|-
| 617
| 617
| data-sort-value="030,1823-0" | 30(1823)
| data-sort-value="0902,011" | IX, 2No. 11
| data-sort-value="711,05" | VII/1, 1No. 5
| Sonata, D 617
| data-sort-value="key B-flat major" | B major
| data-sort-value="1818-06-21" | Summer–Autumn1818(?)
| For piano duet; Allegro moderato – Andante con moto – Allegretto
|-
| 618
| 618
| data-sort-value="XXX,1909" | (1909)
| data-sort-value="ZZZZ" |
| data-sort-value="714,10" | VII/1, 4
| data-sort-value="German Dance with Trios, 2, and Landler, 2" | German Dance with Two Trios and Two Ländler
| data-sort-value="key G major" | G major (Deutscher/Trios)E major (Ländler)
| data-sort-value="1818-06-21" | Summer–Autumn1818
| For piano duet
|-
| 618A
| 618A
| data-sort-value="XXX,1972" | (1972)
| data-sort-value="ZZZZ" |
| data-sort-value="714,A1" | VII/1, 4
| Polonaise, D 618A
| data-sort-value="key B-flat major" | B major
| data-sort-value="1818-07-01" | July 1818
| For piano duet; Sketch
|-
| 619
| 619
| data-sort-value="XXX,1892" | (1892)
| data-sort-value="1900,036" | XIXNo. 36
| data-sort-value="302,22" | III, 2b No. 22VIII, 2 No. 9
| data-sort-value="Sing-Ubungen" | Sing-Übungen (vocal exercises)
| data-sort-value="ZZZZ" |
| data-sort-value="1818-07-01" | July 1818
| For two voices and figured bass
|-
| 620
| 620
| data-sort-value="XXX,1840" | (1840)
| data-sort-value="2005,339" | XX, 5No. 339
| data-sort-value="412,00" | IV, 12
| Einsamkeit, D 620
| data-sort-value="text Gib mir die Fulle der Einsamkeit!" | Gib mir die Fülle der Einsamkeit!
| data-sort-value="1818-07-01" | July 1818
| data-sort-value="Text by Mayrhofer, Johann, Gib mir die Fulle der Einsamkeit!" | Text by Mayrhofer
|-
| 621
| 621
| data-sort-value="XXX,1826" | (1826)
| data-sort-value="ZZZZ" |
| data-sort-value="106,A0" | I, 6 Anh.
| Deutsches Requiem (German Requiem) a.k.a. Deutsche Trauermesse
| data-sort-value="key G minor" | G minorBei des Entschlafnen Trauerbahre
| data-sort-value="1818-08-01" | August 1818
| data-sort-value="Text by Schmid, Christoph von, Bei des Entschlafnen Trauerbahre" | Text by Schmid; Only known in Ferd. Schubert's arrangements; Publ. 1826 for satbSATB and organ
|-
| 622
| 622
| data-sort-value="XXX,1833" | (1833)
| data-sort-value="2005,340" | XX, 5No. 340
| data-sort-value="412,00" | IV, 12
| data-sort-value="Blumenbrief, Der" | Der Blumenbrief
| data-sort-value="text Euch Blumlein will ich senden" | Euch Blümlein will ich senden
| data-sort-value="1818-08-01" | August 1818
| data-sort-value="Text by Schreiber, Aloys, Euch Blumlein will ich senden"| Text by 
|-
| 623
| 623
| data-sort-value="XXX,1831" | (1831)
| data-sort-value="2005,341" | XX, 5No. 341
| data-sort-value="412,00" | IV, 12
| data-sort-value="Marienbild, Das" | Das Marienbild
| data-sort-value="text Sei gegrusst, du Frau der Huld" | Sei gegrüßt, du Frau der Huld
| data-sort-value="1818-08-01" | August 1818
| data-sort-value="Text by Schreiber, Aloys, Sei gegrusst, du Frau der Huld"| Text by 
|-
| 624
| 624
| data-sort-value="010,1822-0" | 10(1822)
| data-sort-value="0902,015" | IX, 2No. 15
| data-sort-value="711,06" | VII/1, 1 No. 6 & Anh. Nos. 5–6
| data-sort-value="Variations, 08, on a French Song" | Eight Variations on a French Song (i.e. Le bon Chevalier)
| data-sort-value="key E minor" | E minor
| data-sort-value="1818-09-01" | September1818
| Theme after Hortense de Beauharnais; For piano duet
|-
| 625
| 625
| data-sort-value="XXX,1897" | (1897)
| data-sort-value="2102,012" | XXI, 2No. 12
| data-sort-value="722,01" | VII/2, 2No. 10
| Piano Sonata, D 625
| data-sort-value="key F minor" | F minor
| data-sort-value="1818-09-01" | September1818
| Allegro (fragment) – Scherzo – Allegro (fragment);  may be its 2nd movement
|-
| 626
| 626
| data-sort-value="XXX,1842" | (1842)
| data-sort-value="2005,343" | XX, 5No. 343
| data-sort-value="412,00" | IV, 12
| Blondel zu Marien
| data-sort-value="text In dustrer Nacht" | In düstrer Nacht
| data-sort-value="1818-09-01" | September1818
| data-sort-value="ZZZZ" |
|-
| 627
| 627
| data-sort-value="173,1867-6" | 173p,6(1867)
| data-sort-value="2005,344" | XX, 5No. 344
| data-sort-value="412,00" | IV, 12
| data-sort-value="Abendrot, Das, D 627" | Das Abendrot, D 627
| data-sort-value="text Du heilig, gluhend Abendrot!" | Du heilig, glühend Abendrot!
| data-sort-value="1818-11-01" | November1818
|-
| 628
| 628
| data-sort-value="XXX,1895" | (1895)
| data-sort-value="2005,345" | XX, 5No. 345
| data-sort-value="412,00" | IV, 12
| Sonett I
| data-sort-value="text Apollo, lebet noch dein hold Verlangen" | Apollo, lebet noch dein hold Verlangen
| data-sort-value="1818-11-01" | November1818
| data-sort-value="Text by Petrarch, transl. by Schlegel, Apollo, lebet noch dein hold Verlangen"| Text by Petrarch, transl. by Schlegel, A. W.
|-
| 629
| 629
| data-sort-value="XXX,1895" | (1895)
| data-sort-value="2005,346" | XX, 5No. 346
| data-sort-value="412,00" | IV, 12
| Sonett II
| data-sort-value="text Allein, nachdenklich, wie gelahmt vom Krampfe" | Allein, nachdenklich, wie gelähmt vom Krampfe
| data-sort-value="1818-11-01" | November1818
| data-sort-value="Text by Petrarch, transl. by Schlegel, Allein, nachdenklich, wie gelahmt vom Krampfe"| Text by Petrarch, transl. by Schlegel, A. W.
|-
| 630
| 630
| data-sort-value="XXX,1895" | (1895)
| data-sort-value="2005,347" | XX, 5No. 347
| data-sort-value="412,00" | IV, 12
| Sonett III
| data-sort-value="text Nunmehr, da Himmel, Erde schweigt" | Nunmehr, da Himmel, Erde schweigt
| data-sort-value="1818-11-01" | November1818
| data-sort-value="Text by Petrarch, transl. by Gries, Nunmehr, da Himmel, Erde schweigt"| Text by Petrarch, transl. by Gries
|-
| 631
| 631
| data-sort-value="XXX,1885" | (1885)
| data-sort-value="2005,348" | XX, 5No. 348
| data-sort-value="412,00" | IV, 12
| Blanka a.k.a. Das Mädchen
| data-sort-value="text Wenn mich einsam Lufte facheln" | Wenn mich einsam Lüfte fächeln
| data-sort-value="1818-12-01" | December1818
| data-sort-value="Text by Schlegel, Friedrich von, Wenn mich einsam Lufte facheln" | Text by Schlegel, F.
|-
| 632
| 632
| data-sort-value="XXX,1831" | (1831)
| data-sort-value="2005,349" | XX, 5No. 349
| data-sort-value="412,00" | IV, 12
| data-sort-value="Vom Mitleiden Maria" | Vom Mitleiden Mariä
| data-sort-value="text Als bei dem Kreuz Maria stand" | Als bei dem Kreuz Maria stand
| data-sort-value="1818-12-01" | December1818
| data-sort-value="Text by Schlegel, Friedrich von, Als bei dem Kreuz Maria stand" | Text by Schlegel, F.
|}

Lists of compositions by Franz Schubert
Compositions by Franz Schubert
Schubert